The 2000 Arkansas State Indians football team represented Arkansas State University as a member of the Big West Conference the 2000 NCAA Division I-A football season. Led by fourth-year head coach Joe Hollis, the Indians compiled an overall record of 1–10 with a mark of 1–4 in conference play, placing in a three-way tie for fourth in the Big West.

Schedule

References

Arkansas State
Arkansas State Red Wolves football seasons
Arkansas State Indians football